Serenjianeh Olya (also Romanized as Serenjīāneh ‘Olyā; also known as Serenjīāneh Bālā, Serīnjīāneh-ye Bālā, and Sīrīnjīāneh-ye Bālā) is a village in Naran Rural District, in the Central District of Sanandaj County, Kurdistan Province, Iran. At the 2006 census, its population was 342, in 78 families. The village is populated by Kurds.

References 

Towns and villages in Sanandaj County
Kurdish settlements in Kurdistan Province